The ATIV Odyssey is a mid-range smartphone manufactured by Samsung. Like all products under the Ativ brand, the Odyssey is a Microsoft Windows-based device. It specifically shipped with the Windows Phone 8 operating system. It was offered through Verizon Wireless and US Cellular. The device was sold by Verizon for $9.99 with a two-year contract.

The Samsung Ativ Odyssey was first released in January 2013.  It has a 4-inch Super AMOLED display and runs on a Qualcomm MSM8960 Snapdragon S4 Plus chipset. The standby battery can last up to 168 hours, and the talk time can last up to 19 hours. The camera has 5MP, autofocus, and LED flash. It also features geo-tagging.

After the product's release, the reception was mixed. Brian Bennett from CNET described it as: "Windows Phone 8 at a low price, but not much else". On the other hand, there are reviews that claimed it is a budget device that performs like a flagship phone.

References

Samsung smartphones
Mobile phones introduced in 2013
Windows Phone devices